The 2000 Peterborough municipal election was held in the city of Peterborough, Ontario, Canada on November 13, 2000, to choose the mayor and city councillors to sit on the Peterborough city council. Electors in Peterborough also voted for the city's representatives on the regional public and separate school boards.

Results

Mayor

Council

Glenn Pagett was born in Peterborough. He served on the Peterborough city council from 1969 to 1972, from 1974 to 1982, and from 1985 to 1997. In 1997, he was acclaimed to a seat on the Peterborough Utilities Commission. He returned to council for a final term from 2000 to 2003 and served as chair of the public works committee. He worked for General Electric in private life from 1952 to 1996 and was sixty-four years old during the 2000 election. Pagett was one of only two councillors to oppose a bailout grant to Showplace Peterborough in 2001; at the time, he argued that he did not want to pre-commit the budget. He later declined to sign a latter drafted by Mayor Sylvia Sutherland that called on the federal government to stay out of the American invasion of Iraq; he said that the matter was beyond his mandate as a city councillor. He also opposed Sutherland's decision to proclaim a gay pride day in Peterborough in late 2003, and was quoted as saying, "I don't believe in same-sex marriage. [...] Right now, I just don't condone what's happening." Pagett was a long-time council ally and personal friend of Jeff Leal, who served with him in the Otonabee Ward. After Leal was elected to the Legislative Assembly of Ontario in the 2003 provincial election, Pagett worked part-time in Leal's constituency office for a few months. Pagett himself did not seek re-election to council in 2003. He served on a disaster relief committee in 2004, following extensive flooding in the city.

John Duncan is a former police officer. He was first elected to the Peterborough city council in 1997. In April 2000, he introduced a motion opposing privatized prisons for Ontario. Later in the year, he initiated debate on constructing a baseball diamond in the city's north end. He was defeated in his bid for re-election in 2000 and later worked with the Peterborough Baseball Council.

Peterborough County
Smith-Ennismore-Lakefield

Source: Bill Hodgins, "Mann reeve of Smith, Lakefield, Ennismore," Peterborough Examiner, 14 November 2000, B5.

References

2000 Ontario municipal elections
Politics of Peterborough, Ontario